Francis, Duke of Saxe-Coburg-Saalfeld (15 July 1750, in Coburg – 9 December 1806, in  Coburg), was one of the ruling Thuringian dukes of the House of Wettin. As progenitor of a line of Coburg princes who, in the 19th and 20th centuries, ascended the thrones of several European realms, he is a patrilineal ancestor of the royal houses of Belgium and Bulgaria (and also of Portugal until the death of King Manuel II in 1932), as well as of several queen consorts.

Biography
Francis was born on 15 July 1750. He is the eldest son of Ernest Frederick, Duke of Saxe-Coburg-Saalfeld and Duchess Sophie Antoinette of Brunswick-Wolfenbüttel.

Francis received a private, careful and comprehensive education and became an art connoisseur. Francis initiated a major collection of books and illustrations for the duchy in 1775, which eventually expanded to a 300,000-picture collection of copperplate engravings currently housed in the Veste Coburg.

Francis was commissioned into the allied army in 1793 when his country was invaded by the Revolutionary armies of France. The allied forces included Hanoverians, Hessians, and the British. He fought in several actions against the French.

Francis succeeded his father as reigning Duke of Saxe-Coburg-Saalfeld in 1800. In the discharge of his father's debts the Schloss Rosenau had passed out of the family but in 1805 he bought back the property as a summer residence for the ducal family.

Emperor Francis II dissolved the Holy Roman Empire on 6 August 1806, after its defeat by Napoleon at the Battle of Austerlitz. Duke Francis died 9 December 1806. On 15 December 1806, Saxe-Coburg-Saalfeld, along with the other Ernestine duchies, entered the Confederation of the Rhine as the Duke and his ministers planned.

First marriage
In Hildburghausen on 6 March 1776, Francis married Princess Sophie of Saxe-Hildburghausen, a daughter of his Ernestine kinsman, Duke Ernst Friedrich III and Princess Ernestine of Saxe-Weimar-Eisenach. She died on 28 October 1776, only seven months after her wedding. There were no children born from this marriage.

Second marriage and children
In Ebersdorf on 13 June 1777, Francis married Countess Augusta Reuss of Lobenstein-Ebersdorf, daughter of Heinrich XXIV, Count Reuss of Ebersdorf and his wife Countess Karoline Ernestine of Erbach-Schönberg. They had ten children, seven of whom survived to adulthood:

His male-line descendants established ruling houses in Belgium, United Kingdom, Portugal and Bulgaria, while retaining the duchy of Saxe-Coburg and Gotha until 1918. His son Leopold ruled as Leopold I of the Belgians. A grandson reigned jure uxoris as King Ferdinand II of Portugal while a great-grandson named Ferdinand  became the first modern king of Bulgaria. One of his granddaughters was Empress Carlota of Mexico, while another was Queen Victoria of the United Kingdom. The latter's son, Edward VII, a patrilineal as well as matrilineal great-grandson of Francis, inaugurated upon his accession to the British throne in 1901 the House of Saxe-Coburg and Gotha, the name of the ruling dynasty of the United Kingdom until the house name was changed to Windsor by King George V in 1917.

Ancestry

References

 August Beck: Franz Friedrich Anton, Herzog von Sachsen-Koburg-Saalfeld. In: Allgemeine Deutsche Biographie (ADB) vol. VII, Duncker & Humblot, Leipzig 1877, p. 296.
 Carl-Christian Dressel: Die Entwicklung von Verfassung und Verwaltung in Sachsen-Coburg 1800 - 1826 im Vergleich, Duncker & Humblot, Berlin 2007, .
 Christian Kruse: Franz Friedrich Anton von Sachsen-Coburg-Saalfeld: 1750 - 1806, in: Jahrbuch der Coburger Landesstiftung, Coburg 1995.

1750 births
1806 deaths
People from Coburg
Dukes of Saxe-Coburg-Saalfeld
House of Wettin